William Strickland (27 May 1882 – 8 November 1958) was an Australian rules footballer who played with Carlton in the Victorian Football League (VFL).

Notes

External links 

	
Bill Strickland's profile at Blueseum

1882 births
Australian rules footballers from Victoria (Australia)
Carlton Football Club players
1958 deaths